Bianca Franceschinelli Bin (born 3 September 1990) is a Brazilian actress.

Early life
Bianca is from the city of Jundiaí in the interior of the State of São Paulo, and moved with three months of age to Itu, also in the interior of São Paulo, where she was raised.

Career
She played the lead role, Marina, in the 2009 season of Malhação. After leaving Malhação, she played popular character Fátima in Rede Globo's telenovela Passione. Her character was involved in a romantic relationship with Cauã Reymond's character in that telenovela.

She played the lead role in the 2011 Rede Globo's telenovela Cordel Encantado, replacing actress Paola Oliveira who chose to work in another Rede Globo telenovela, Insensato Coração. In Cordel Encantado, she worked for the second time with Cauã Reymond, who played her character's romantic interest. Her character is named Açucena Bezerra, and is also a princess. She played a villain named Carolina in the 2012 telenovela Guerra dos Sexos. Bin also portrayed the lead role in the 2013 Rede Globo telenovela Joia Rara as Amélia. She starred as the villain Vitória in the telenovela Boogie Oogie. She plays a pregnant woman named Maria in the 2016 telenovela Êta Mundo Bom!.
Currently, she is playing Clara the main protagonist in the telenovela O Outro Lado do Paraíso. She is working the second time with the actors Sérgio Guizé, Eliane Giardini and Arthur Aguiar.

Filmography

Television

Film

Awards and nominations

Melhores do Ano

Prêmio Quem de Televisão

Prêmio Contigo! de TV

Prêmio Jovem Brasileiro

Troféu Internet

Prêmio Extra de Televisão

References

External links 
 

1990 births
Living people
People from Jundiaí
Brazilian people of Italian descent
Brazilian telenovela actresses
Brazilian film actresses
21st-century Brazilian actresses